Get Well Soon: History's Worst Plagues and the Heroes Who Fought Them is a nonfiction book by Jennifer Wright, first published in 2017 by Henry Holt and Company. The book’s reception was generally positive, with reviews from publications including Publishers Weekly, Kirkus Reviews, and Library Journal.

References 

2017 non-fiction books
Henry Holt and Company books